Pleurotomella aculeola is a species of sea snail, a marine gastropod mollusk in the family Raphitomidae.

Description
The length of the shell attains 8.5 mm, its diameter 4 mm.

(Original description) The small shell is lanceolate-fusiform. Its colour is buff, stained with ferruginous at the extremities. The shell contains eight whorls, the first three minute, smooth, forming the protoconch, the rest sculptured, 
gradate and rapidly increasing in size. 

Sculpture : broad peripheral undulations compose radial ribs spaced at ten to a whorl, fine spiral cords continue across both ribs and interstices and extend over the base. Of these, the body whorl carries sixteen and the penultimate six, those on the periphery increase in size and sharpen the projection of the ribs. The aperture is ovate,. The outer lip is thin, simple, with a slight smear of callus on the columella. The siphonal canal is short, straight and open.

Distribution
This marine species is endemic to Australia and occurs off New South Wales.

References

 Laseron, C. 1954. Revision of the New South Wales Turridae (Mollusca). Australian Zoological Handbook. Sydney : Royal Zoological Society of New South Wales pp. 56, pls 1–12.
 Powell, A.W.B. 1966. The molluscan families Speightiidae and Turridae, an evaluation of the valid taxa, both Recent and fossil, with list of characteristic species. Bulletin of the Auckland Institute and Museum. Auckland, New Zealand 5: 1–184, pls 1–23
 Beu, A.G. 2011 Marine Molluscs of oxygen isotope stages of the last 2 million years in New Zealand. Part 4. Gastropoda (Ptenoglossa, Neogastropoda, Heterobranchia). Journal of the Royal Society of New Zealand 41, 1–153

External links
 

aculeola
Gastropods described in 1915
Gastropods of Australia